Club de Rugby Liceo Francés is a Spanish rugby union club. The club was established in 1968 and currently competes in the División de Honor B competition, the second level of Spanish rugby. The club are based in Madrid, Spain. Liceo play in white, blue and red colours.

Honours
División de Honor: 0
Runners-up: 1990–91, 1992–93
Copa del Rey: 0
Runners-up: 1989–90, 2000–01
Copa FER: 1
Champions: 1996
Primera Nacional: 3
Champions: 1976–77, 1985–86, 1988–89

Season by season

14 seasons in División de Honor
10 seasons in División de Honor B

Trivia
Spanish actors Javier Bardem and Sergio Peris-Mencheta are former players of the club.

See also
 Rugby union in Spain

References

External links
 Official website
 Spanish Rugby website

Spanish rugby union teams
Sports teams in Madrid
Rugby clubs established in 1968